The 2016 AFC Women's Olympic Qualifying Tournament was the 4th edition of the AFC Women's Olympic Qualifying Tournament, the quadrennial international football competition organised by the Asian Football Confederation (AFC) to determine which women's national teams from Asia qualify for the Olympic football tournament.

The top two teams of the tournament qualified for the 2016 Summer Olympics women's football tournament in Brazil as the AFC representatives.

On 7 March 2016, with one round of matches remaining to be played, Australia and China were confirmed qualification to the Olympics.

Teams
A total of 18 AFC member national teams entered the qualifying stage. The format is as follows:
First round: The highest-ranked seven teams based on the FIFA Women's World Rankings at the time of the draw received byes. Teams ranked in the top five – Japan, Australia, North Korea, China PR, and South Korea – received byes to the final round, while teams ranked sixth and seventh – Thailand and Vietnam – received byes to the second round. The remaining 11 teams were drawn into two groups of four teams and one group of three teams, with the teams seeded according to their FIFA Rankings. In each group, teams played each other once at a centralised venue. The three group winners advanced to the second round.
Second round: The five teams (two teams who entered this round and the three winners from the first round) played each other once at a centralised venue. The winner advanced to the final round.
Final round: The six teams (five teams who entered this round and the winner from the second round) played each other once at a centralised venue. The top two teams qualified for the Olympic football tournament.

The draw for the qualifiers was held on 4 December 2014 at the AFC House in Kuala Lumpur, Malaysia.

Notes
1 Non-IOC member, ineligible for Olympics.

Schedule
The schedule of the qualifying stage was as follows.

First round

Group A
All matches were held in Myanmar.
Times listed were UTC+6:30.

Group B
All matches were held in Jordan.
Times listed were UTC+2.

Group C
All matches were held in Taiwan.
Times listed were UTC+8.

Second round
All matches were held in Myanmar.
Times listed were UTC+6:30.

Final round
All matches were held in Japan.
Times listed were UTC+9.

Qualified teams for Olympics
The following two teams from AFC qualified for the Olympic football tournament.

1 Bold indicates champion for that year. Italic indicates host for that year.
2 Australia qualified as a member of the OFC in 2000 and 2004.

Goalscorers
9 goals
 Khin Moe Wai

6 goals

 Win Theingi Tun
 Nguyễn Thị Minh Nguyệt

4 goals

 Kyah Simon
 Maysa Jbarah
 Naw Ar Lo Wer Phaw
 Yee Yee Oo

3 goals

 Michelle Heyman
 Emily van Egmond
 Lee Hsiu-chin
 Mana Iwabuchi
 Stephanie Al-Naber
 Anootsara Maijarern
 Huỳnh Như

2 goals

 Katrina Gorry
 Gu Yasha
 Zhang Rui
 Chan Wing Sze
 Shabnam Behesht
 Yūki Ōgimi
 Kumi Yokoyama
 Khin Marlar Tun
 Wai Wai Aung
 Jung Seol-bin
 Lim Seon-joo
 Kamola Riskieva

1 goal

 Lisa De Vanna
 Emily Gielnik
 Alanna Kennedy
 Clare Polkinghorne
 Ashleigh Sykes
 Ma Xiaoxu
 Wang Shanshan
 Wang Shuang
 Chan Pi-han
 Lai Li-chin
 Lin Chiung-ying
 Lin Ya-han
 Michelle Pao
 Yu Hsiu-chin
 Loitongbam Ashalata Devi
 Gurumayum Radharani Devi
 Yumnam Kamala Devi
 Fatemeh Arjangi
 Fereshteh Karimi
 Parya Norouzi
 Nahomi Kawasumi
 Emi Nakajima
 Shinobu Ohno
 Luna Al-Masri
 Shahnaz Jebreen
 Souphavanh Phayvanh
 San San Maw
 Than Than Htwe
 Ju Hyo-sim
 Kim Su-gyong
 Kim Un-ju
 Ra Un-sim
 Kiloudi Salama
 Natali Shaheen
 Jeon Ga-eul
 Lee Geum-min
 Nargiza Abdurasulova
 Nilufar Kudratova
 Zumratjon Nazarova
 Makhliyo Sarikova
 Feruza Turdiboeva

Own goal

 Yasmeen Khair (playing against Chinese Taipei)
 Nisansala Sewwandi (playing against Myanmar)
 Imesha Madushani (playing against India)
 Lin Kai-ling (playing against Myanmar)

References

External links
, the-AFC.com
Women's Olympic Football Tournament 2016, stats.the-AFC.com

2016
Football at the 2016 Summer Olympics – Women's qualification
Women's Olympic Qualifying Tournament
2015 in women's association football
Women's Olympic Qualifying Tournament
2016 in women's association football